Jennifer Rush is the debut studio album by American pop singer Jennifer Rush, released on March 2, 1984 by CBS Records International. The album was commercially successful across Europe, reaching the top 10 in many countries, including Germany, where it spent 97 weeks on the chart. It features the song "The Power of Love", which when released as a single reached number one in several countries around the world.

Overview
Based in Germany, Rush teamed up with producers Candy DeRouge and Gunther Mende and released the first two singles from this album; "Into My Dreams" and "Come Give Me Your Hand" in 1983. It was in 1984, however, that she found her first success with the song "25 Lovers". This was followed by "Ring of Ice" and then with the song she would become famous the world over for—"The Power of Love". In 1985, the song became a massive success and reached number one on the UK Singles Chart for five weeks, selling over a million copies. It was at the time the best-selling single ever by a female artist and is still one of the best-selling singles ever. Success in her native United States proved elusive, however, as the single peaked at No. 57 on the Billboard Hot 100.

Having been released in Germany in 1984, the album was repackaged and released internationally in late 1985. It became a big seller, peaking at No. 7 in the UK and No. 2 in Germany, spending 97 weeks on the German chart. In other European countries, the album also charted well, topping the charts in Norway and reaching the top five in Sweden, Switzerland, and Austria.

"Ring of Ice" was chosen as the follow-up single in the UK, where it charted within the top 20. Further hits proved harder to come by, however, as another UK release, "Madonna's Eyes" failed to reach the top 75, although it reached No. 5 in France and No. 12 in South Africa.

In some countries, the Jennifer Rush album was a cross section of tracks from this release and Movin', either titled Jennifer Rush (Canada, German Democratic Republic) or Movin' (Venezuela).

Track listing

Charts

Weekly charts

Year-end charts

Certifications

Release history

References

External links
 

1984 debut albums
CBS Records albums
Jennifer Rush albums